or Afghanistan is a Japanese yonkoma manga, originally published as a webcomic, by Timaking (ちまきing).  It is also the name of the heroine of the manga. The manga is nicknamed

Background
Afghanis-tan illustrates the modern history of Afghanistan and its neighboring countries, starting from the imperialist era in the 19th century, through moe anthropomorphism. The title character, a short and clumsy bishōjo, is a national personification of Afghanistan. Other female characters personify the nearby nations of Central Asia, such as Pakistan and Uzbekistan. Nations that have fought wars in Afghanistan at various times, such as Britain, the Soviet Union and the United States also make appearances. The Taliban regime and Al-Qaeda terrorist group are also represented in the comic as feral cats.

Each yonkoma strip is accompanied by an "Afghan Memo" that explains in prose some of the background and history of the nations depicted. Additional pages give short biographies of the characters.

The fact that it is a moe manga depicting international conflict, and the fact that it personifies countries, has drawn some criticism. However, it has also drawn attention for its attempt to blend an appropriate depiction of the history and background of each country with the personality of its characters.

Afghanis-tan has finished, and work on its sequel, "Pakis-tan" (ISBN 4-86199-116-1), was suspended after four editions but was released back in 2008 by the company SansaiBooks. The author of both the comics caught a virus on his computer that leaked his personal info, after that he had taken down his website and had moved on from associating with the comics.

On July 26, 2005, after several delays, the series went on sale as a comic book, "Afghanis-tan".

Characters

 
 The protagonist of the series, an unfortunate girl surrounded by neighbors with strong personalities. According to her character description, "she trips and falls a lot". Her design appears to be based on Sharbat Gula, an Afghan woman whose iconic photo appeared on the cover of the June 1985 issue of National Geographic.
 
 Boastful, and often feels lonely, especially without Kashmir. Likes Afghanis-tan.
 
 Stubborn and a sore loser. Often quarrels with Pakis-tan. Idolizes "Older-Sister Russia".
 
 A salt-of-the-earth Edokko type, quick to argue and quick to make up. Has girlish tastes.
 
 Quick-thinking and sharp-tongued. Always riding on a wooden horse.
 
 A girl with a mysterious personality. One never knows her true thoughts. (Cf. Saparmurat Niyazov)
 
 The richest person in the neighborhood and a bully.
 
 A group of feral cats causing trouble in the neighborhood. Come to live in Afghanis-tan's house while she is out.

Reception 
As it makes it easy for readers to learn about the history and geography of Central Asia, topics which Japanese people are not very familiar with, it could be thought of as an educational text. Around the time when the book was published by Sansai Books, again, part of the intention was to  provide information about the current state of Afghanistan.

There is criticism that using the style of "moe" trivializes the situation. In particular, the terrorist attacks of September 11, 2001 were depicted as "an incident where a cat called Al-Qaeda bit America", a fact which was severely criticized in the secondary work, "".

Collections

See also
 Hetalia: Axis Powers — a series with a similar premise, but instead employs bishōnen to represent Italy and its interactions with other countries, particularly around World War I and World War II.

References
 "Popular Web Mangaka Vanishes After Winny Incident" . Anime News Service . 5-2-06

External links 
  Partial archive of Afghanis-tan site (many images not available)
 

Moe anthropomorphism
Yonkoma
Japanese webcomics
National personifications in comic books
Webcomics in print
Historical webcomics
2000s webcomics
History of Afghanistan in fiction
Afghanistan in fiction
Works about the Great Game
2003 manga
Islam in comics